Nicholas Lamert Luard (26 June 1937 Hampstead, London – 25 May 2004 Kensington, London) was a writer and politician.

Background

He was educated at Winchester College and Magdalene College, Cambridge, where he read English and was taught by F. R. Leavis. He met Peter Cook through Footlights. A very short academic career was replaced by club management on the strength of a legacy. He co-founded The Establishment in the early 1960s with Peter Cook.

He then went into writing. He was one of the Lords Gnome of Private Eye.

With Chris Brasher, Nigel Hawkins and Denis Mollison, he founded the John Muir Trust in 1983. Nick served as Chairman from 1991 to 1997.

Luard stood as a candidate for the Referendum Party in the 1997 general election, against Michael Portillo in Enfield Southgate.

Luard married Elisabeth Longmore, the food writer, in 1962.

Bibliography
Refer to Drawer: Being a Penetrating Survey of a Shameful National Practice - Hustling. With Dominick Elwes; illus. John Glashan. London: Arthur Barker, 1964.
The Warm and Golden War. London: Secker & Warburg, 1967. New York: Pantheon, 1967.
Travelling Horseman. London: Weidenfeld & Nicolson, 1975.
The Robespierre Serial. London: Weidenfeld & Nicolson, 1975. New York: Harcourt Brace Jovanovich, 1975
The Orion Line. London: Secker & Warburg, 1976
Blood Spoor. Under the pen name of James McVean, London: Raven Books, 1977
The Dirty Area. London: Hamish Hamilton, 1979
The Last Wilderness: A Journey Across the Great Kalahari Desert. New York: Simon & Schuster, 1981. London: Elm Tree, 1981
Andalucia: A Portrait of Southern Spain. London: Century, 1984
The Wildlife Parks of Africa. London: Michael Joseph, 1985
Landscape in Spain. Photographs by Michael Bussele. Boston: Little, Brown, 1988. London: Pavilion, 1988
Gondar. London: Century, 1988
Kala. London: Century, 1990
Himalaya. London: Century, 1992
Sanctuary. London: Hodder & Stoughton, 1994
Silverback. London: Hodder & Stoughton, 1996
The Field of the Star: Pilgrim's Journey to Santiago De Compostela. London: Michael Joseph, 1998

References

External links
Guardian obituary by Patrick Marnham
Fantastic Fiction

1937 births
2004 deaths
Private Eye contributors
Alumni of Magdalene College, Cambridge
People educated at Winchester College
Referendum Party politicians